Megachile paulista is a species of bee in the family Megachilidae. It was described by Schrottky in 1920.

References

Paulista
Insects described in 1920